Drowned lands is a name sometimes given to seasonally flooded areas, or to areas flooded by reservoirs. Sometimes it is poetically applied to lands said to have been lost to the sea, such as Lyonesse.

There are certain locations particularly identified with this appellation:

United States
 Ancram, New York, in the valley of Punch Brook
 Fish House, New York, now covered by Great Sacandaga Lake
 Between Hamburg, New Jersey and Denton, New York, along the Wallkill River, drained to form the "Black Dirt Country"
 Medford, New Jersey
 Along the Wabash River in Indiana
 Putnam, Dresden and Whitehall, New York, at the south end of Lake Champlain

Netherlands
Verdronken Land van Saeftinghe
Verdronken Land van Reimerswaal

Notes

Flood